A plebiscite on conscription was held in Canada on 27 April 1942. It was held in response to the Conservative Party lobbying Prime Minister William Lyon Mackenzie King (Liberal leader) to introduce compulsory overseas military service, the government having previously promised not to introduce same in 1940. The result was 66% voting in favour, with Quebec being the only province to have a majority voting against. Quebec's strong majority against the comitment's release prompted the prime minister not to pursue the issue until later events prompted a change in position.

Content 
The following question appeared on the ballot:

Results

By province

|- style="text-align:center;background:#E9E9E9;"
! colspan="5" | Canadian conscription plebiscite, 1942
|- style="text-align:center;background:#E9E9E9;"
! rowspan="2" style="text-align:left;" | Jurisdiction
! colspan="2" |  Yes
! colspan="2" | No
|- style="text-align:center;background:#E9E9E9;"
! Votes !! % !! Votes !! %
|-
| style="text-align:left;" | Alberta || 186,624 ||  || 75,880 || 28.9
|-
| style="text-align:left;" | British Columbia || 253,844 ||  || 62,033 || 19.6
|-
| style="text-align:left;" | Manitoba || 218,093 ||  || 53,651 || 19.7
|-
| style="text-align:left;" | New Brunswick || 105,629 ||  || 45,743 || 30.2
|-
| style="text-align:left;" | Nova Scotia || 120,763 ||  || 35,840 || 22.1
|-
| style="text-align:left;" | Ontario || 1,202,953 ||  || 229,847 || 16.0
|-
| style="text-align:left;" | Prince Edward Island || 23,569 ||  || 4,869 || 17.1
|-
| style="text-align:left;" | Quebec || 375,650 || 27.9 || 971,925 || 
|-
| style="text-align:left;" | Saskatchewan || 183,617 ||  || 67,654 || 26.9
|-
| style="text-align:left;" | Yukon || 847 ||  || 291 || 25.6
|- style="background:#F2F2F2;"
! style="text-align:left;" | Total civilian vote !! 2,670,088 !!  !! 1,547,724 !! 36.7
|- style="background:#F2F2F2;"
| style="text-align:left;" | Military vote || 251,118 ||  || 60,885 || 19.5
|- style="background:#F2F2F2;"
! style="text-align:left;" | Canada !! 2,921,206 !!  !! 1,608,609 !! 35.5
|}

The referendum was held in all 245 electoral districts, which covered all nine provinces and one of the two territories.  Residents in the Northwest Territories did not have a vote, as their area was not organized as an electoral district.

References

Referendums in Canada
1942 referendums
1942 in Canada
Conscription referendums
1942 in Quebec
April 1942 events
Canada in World War II